Miley Cyrus (born 1992) is an American singer-songwriter and actress.

Miley may also refer to:
 Miley (given name)
 Miley (surname)
 Fort Miley Military Reservation
 Miley Memorial Field

See also
Maile (disambiguation)